Curve of the Earth is the fifth studio album by the Mystery Jets.

The album peaked at number 30 on the UK Albums Chart.

Track listing

References 

Mystery Jets albums
2016 albums
Rough Trade Records albums